Thorington is a village and a civil parish in the hundred of Blything, in the East Suffolk district of the English county of Suffolk. The A12 main road runs through the parish to the east of the village. Thorington Hall was demolished in 1949, but The Round House, a listed gamekeeper's lodge for the Thorington Estate, survives.

Church Farm Nature Reserve
Church Farm Marshes is a nature reserve located in the parish. It consists of an area of meadow and marshland  in size along a tributary of the River Blyth. The reserve is owned and managed by Suffolk Wildlife Trust and is designated as a County Wildlife Site.

References 

Villages in Suffolk
Civil parishes in Suffolk